Cross tie can refer to:
A kind of bow tie.
Cross tie (railroad)
Cross tie (stable)
Cross Tie (song, see Over the James)